Nallampalayam is a Panchayat Town in Sendurai Taluk, Ariyalur district, Tamil Nadu, South India, 23 km from Ariyalur Town and 3 km from Sendurai.

References 

Cities and towns in Ariyalur district